Venkat Shrinivas Deshpande (11 August 1920―4 February 2013) was an Indian Judge and former Chief Justice of the Bombay High Court.

Career
Deshpande was born in 1920. He passed LL.B. from University College of Law, under Osmania University. At first he was a practitioner of Hyderabad High Court but in 1957 he started practice in the Bombay High Court on Civil and Criminal matters. Deshpande became an Assistant Government Pleader in March 1961 and was appointed a Judge of the Bombay High Court on 11 June 1967. He worked as acting Chief Justice in 1980 and thereafter was permanently elevated as the Chief Justice of Bombay High Court on 12 January 1981 after Justice B. N. Deshmukh. After retirement Deshpande also worked as Maharashtra Lokayukta till 26 September 1989.

References

1920 births
2013 deaths
Indian judges
Judges of the Bombay High Court
Chief Justices of the Bombay High Court
20th-century Indian judges
21st-century Indian judges
Osmania University alumni
Ombudsmen in India